Riley Creek is a  long stream in the U.S. state of Ohio. It is a tributary of the Blanchard River.

Riley Creek was named for James W. Riley, a pioneer who drowned while crossing the stream.

See also
List of rivers of Ohio

References

Rivers of Allen County, Ohio
Rivers of Darke County, Ohio
Rivers of Hardin County, Ohio
Rivers of Ohio